Syamsul Bachri Chaeruddin (born 9 February 1983) is an Indonesian former footballer who plays as a midfielder. He has represented Indonesia in the sport.

Born in Gowa, South Sulawesi, Syamsul played for PSM Makassar in the 2005 AFC Champions League group stage, where he scored one goal.

Syamsul played for the Indonesia national football team. He is one of the best defensive midfielders in his country with his aggression and a courageous playing style, despite his lack of size. His international début in the national team was at a friendly match for Indonesia against Malaysia on 12 March 2004. Indonesia drew 0–0 in this game. At the Asian Cup 2007 he played 3 times: in a 2–1 win against Bahrain (as substitute for Mahyadi Panggabean, who was injured); in the 1–2 loss against Saudi Arabia, and in the 0–1 loss to South Korea, the last game in group D.

National team career 
 2002: Junior National Team U-21, Tiger Cup (selection)
 2003: Pre Olympic, Sea Games XXII Vietnam
 2004: Pre World Cup, Tiger Cup
 2005: Sea Games XXIII Philippines
 2006: Brunei Merdeka Games, BV International Cup
 2007: AFF Cup, Asian Cup

Honours

Club honors
Sriwijaya
 Indonesia Super League: 2011–12
 Inter Island Cup: 2012

Country honors
 Champion of Hassanal Bolkiah Trophy : Indonesia U-21 (2002)
 Champion of Indonesian Independence Cup : Indonesia (2008)

References

External links
 

Indonesian footballers
1983 births
Living people
Bugis people
Sportspeople from South Sulawesi
Indonesia international footballers
2007 AFC Asian Cup players
2004 AFC Asian Cup players
Persija Jakarta players
Sriwijaya F.C. players
PSM Makassar players
PSS Sleman players
Liga 1 (Indonesia) players
Association football midfielders
People from Gowa Regency